Jan Štefan (born 2 September 1943) is a Czech rower who represented Czechoslovakia. He competed at the 1964 Summer Olympics in Tokyo with the men's coxed four where they were eliminated in the round one repêchage.

References

1943 births
Living people
Czechoslovak male rowers
Olympic rowers of Czechoslovakia
Rowers at the 1964 Summer Olympics
European Rowing Championships medalists